HNoMS Frithjof was a 1. class gunboat (built for the Royal Norwegian Navy. Like the other Norwegian gunboats of her era, she carried a heavy armament on a diminutive hull. The vessel was built at the Naval Yard at Horten, and had yard number 76.

Frithjof served with the Norwegian Navy as a gunboat and cadet training ship until stricken in 1928.

References

 Naval history via Flix: Frithjof,
 Viking (First Class Gunboat, 1891-1920), retrieved 17 March 2006

Ships built in Horten
Frithjof
1895 ships
Training ships of the Royal Norwegian Navy